Danchenko (Cyrillic: Данченко) is a gender-neutral Ukrainian surname. It may refer to the following notable people:
 Anastasiya Danchenko (born 1990), Russian badminton player
 Igor Danchenko, Russian analyst in the United States
 Oleh Danchenko (born 1994), Ukrainian footballer
 Oleksandr Danchenko (born 1974), Ukrainian politician
 Vasily Nemirovich-Danchenko (1845–1936), Russian novelist and journalist, brother of Vladimir
 Vladimir Nemirovich-Danchenko (1858–1943), Russian playwright and theatre director

See also
 

Ukrainian-language surnames